Charles Hope (16 October 1768 – 1 July 1828) was a British general and politician.

Political Career
He was Member of Parliament (MP) for Dysart Burghs from 1790 to 1796.

On 12 May 1800, he was elected as MP for Haddingtonshire. He resigned from Parliament on 21 March 1816, accepting the stewardship of the Chiltern Hundreds.

References

1768 births
1828 deaths
Members of the Parliament of Great Britain for Scottish constituencies
British MPs 1790–1796
British MPs 1796–1800
Members of the Parliament of the United Kingdom for Scottish constituencies
UK MPs 1802–1806
UK MPs 1806–1807
UK MPs 1807–1812
British Army generals